Food Fight may refer to:
 Food fight, a form of chaotic collective behavior in which food is thrown at others

Film and television
 Foodfight! a 2012 animated film
 Food Fight (TV series), a 2000 Japanese television drama
 Food Fights, an episode of Celebrity Deathmatch
 Food Fight, an episode of The King of Queens
 Food Fight, an episode Mighty Morphin Power Rangers season 1

Video games
 Food Fight (video game), a 1980s arcade game
 Food Fight, a character from Skylanders: Trap Team

Other uses
 Food Fight: The Inside Story of the Food Industry, a 2004 book

See also
 Food Fighters (action figures), an action figure collection by Mattel
 Food Fighters (TV series), a 2014 NBC reality television competition series presented by Adam Richman
 Food for Fighters, a 1943 propaganda short
 Food riot
 Foo Fighters, an American rock band
 Food Battle (disambiguation)
Food Wars (disambiguation)